Julian Krinsky is an American, former South African, professional tennis and squash player. He won medals in tennis  at the 1969 Maccabiah Games and the 1973 Maccabiah Games in Israel, and competed at the French Open and Wimbledon. He won a silver medal for the United States in squash in the 1981 Maccabiah Games.

Biography
Originally from Johannesburg, Krinsky immigrated to the United States in 1977 and is a resident of Philadelphia, Pennsylvania. Krinsky was active on tour in the 1960s and 1970s. 

A Jewish athlete, Krinsky won two medals for South Africa at the 1969 Maccabiah Games in Tel Aviv, Israel, including a bronze for singles, where he lost to American Allen Fox in the semi-finals, and a silver medal in doubles. He featured in the singles main draws of the 1969 Wimbledon Championships and 1970 French Open. He won a bronze medal in doubles at the 1973 Maccabiah Games.

He won a silver medal for the United States in squash in the 1981 Maccabiah Games.

He previously ran the Julian Krinsky Camps and Programs.

References

External links
 
 

Year of birth missing (living people)
Living people
South African male tennis players
American male squash players
South African Jews
Jewish tennis players
Maccabiah Games medalists in tennis
Maccabiah Games medalists in squash
Maccabiah Games silver medalists for the United States
Maccabiah Games silver medalists for South Africa
Maccabiah Games bronze medalists for South Africa
Competitors at the 1969 Maccabiah Games
Competitors at the 1973 Maccabiah Games
Competitors at the 1981 Maccabiah Games
South African emigrants to the United States
Tennis players from Johannesburg